Events from the year 2012 in Taiwan, Republic of China. This year is numbered Minguo 101 according to the official Republic of China calendar.

Incumbents
 President – Ma Ying-jeou
 Vice President – Vincent Siew, Wu Den-yih
 Premier – Wu Den-yih, Sean Chen
 Vice Premier – Sean Chen, Jiang Yi-huah

Events

January
 1 January
 Taipei 101 New Year's Day Fireworks Countdown at Taipei 101 was television broadcast on TVBS News.
 The renaming of Council for Hakka Affairs to Hakka Affairs Council.
 5 January – The opening of Fu Jen University Station, Touqianzhuang Station and Xinzhuang Station of Taipei Metro in Xinzhuang District, New Taipei.
 14 January
 2012 Republic of China presidential election.
 2012 Republic of China legislative election.
 15 January – The officiating ceremony of Xiaolin Village Memorial Park in Jiasian District, Kaohsiung.
 23–25 January – Chinese New Year's Day (dragon year) at Taipei 101 was television broadcast on TVBS News.

February
 3 February – The opening of Guo Ziyi Memorial Hall in Neihu District, Taipei.
 6 February
 Sean Chen became the Premier of the Republic of China.
 Jiang Yi-huah became the Vice Premier of the Republic of China.
 16 February – The visit of Beijing Mayor Guo Jinlong to Taiwan for a 6-day visit.

March
 1 March
 The establishment of Taiwan International Ports Corporation.
 The establishment of Maritime and Port Bureau.

April
 1 April – Skip Beat! was closing telecast aired on Formosa Television.
 23–29 April 2012 OEC Kaohsiung
 25–26 April – 2012 Democratic Progressive Party presidential primary.

May
 7 May – The visit of Hubei Governor Wang Guosheng to Taiwan for an 8-day visit.
 12 May – The opening of Miaoli Hakka Cultural Park in Miaoli County.
 13 May – The opening of Macau Economic and Cultural Office at Taipei 101 in Xinyi District, Taipei City.
 15 May – The inauguration of Hong Kong Economic, Trade and Cultural Office in Taipei City.
 20 May
 Ma Ying-jeou inaugurated as the President of the Republic of China for the second term.
 Wu Den-yih inaugurated as the Vice President of the Republic of China.
 The Aviation Safety Council became an independent body from the Executive Yuan.
 The establishment of Ministry of Culture from the former Council for Cultural Affairs.
 The disestablishment of Government Information Office.
 22 May – The establishment of Bureau of Audiovisual and Music Industry Development of the Ministry of Culture.

June
 27 June – The opening of the first Taiwanese branch of Bank of China located in Taipei City.
 30 June at 12:00 Taiwan Time - The digital switchover in Taiwan is completed, and analogue television ended operation.

July
 7 July – Referendum for casinos establishment in Lienchiang County which 56% voters voted in favor.

August
 5 August – The East China Sea Peace Initiative proposed by President Ma Ying-jeou.
 11 August – The opening of Yeh Shih-tao Literature Memorial Hall in West Central District, Tainan City.
 24–28 August – The Harvard Project for Asian and International Relations Asia Conference in Taipei.

September
 1 September – The establishment of Institute of Diplomacy and International Affairs of the Ministry of Foreign Affairs.
 10 September – The establishment of Taoyuan American School in Luzhu Township, Taoyuan County.
 28 September – The opening of Beihu Station in Hukou Township, Hsinchu County.

November
 21 November – The establishment of China Affairs Committee of the Democratic Progressive Party.
 28 November – The closing of Baoshan Station of Taiwan Railways Administration in Taoyuan City, Taoyuan County.

December
 19 December – The establishment of Labor Union of National Taiwan University.
 24 December – The opening of Taiwan Stock Museum in Songshan District, Taipei.
 28 December – The discontinuation of Linkou Line of Taiwan Railways Administration.

Deaths
 3 January – Fong Fei-fei, 58, Taiwanese singer, lung cancer.
 25 February – , 86, Taiwanese essayist and engineer.
 1 April – Chang Mei-yao, 71, Taiwanese actress.
 15 June – Ming Ji, 89, Taiwanese film director, organ failure.
 20 June – Liao Fu-pen, 74, Taiwanese politician, MLY (1984–2002), multiple organ failure.
 14 July – Wen Hsing-tsun, 86, Taiwanese politician, MLY (1987–1990), pancreatic cancer.
 20 July – , 30, Taiwanese actor.
 22 August – Paul Shan Kuo-hsi, 87, Taiwanese Roman Catholic cardinal.
 23 August – Paul Ch'eng Shih-kuang, 96, Taiwanese Roman Catholic bishop.
 13 September – , 69, Taiwanese entertainer, lung cancer and multiple organ failure.
 7 December – Chen Wen-yu, 88, Taiwanese horticulturalist.
 26 December 
 Chu Ting-shun, 84, Taiwanese musician.
 , 79, Taiwanese essayist and literary critic.
 31 December – Yang Teng-kuei, 74, Taiwanese film producer, stroke.

References

 
Years of the 21st century in Taiwan